Canals may refer to:
 Canals, Tarn-et-Garonne, a commune in the Tarn-et-Garonne department, France
 Canals, Valencia, a municipality in the province of Valencia, Valencian Community, Spain
 Canals, Córdoba, a municipality in the province of Córdoba, Argentina
 B. de Canals, was a 14th-century Spanish author of a Latin chronicle

See also
Lists of canals
Canal (disambiguation)
El Cañal (disambiguation)
Channel (disambiguation)